The Greenwich Foot Tunnel crosses beneath the River Thames in East London, linking Greenwich (Royal Borough of Greenwich) on the south bank with Millwall (London Borough of Tower Hamlets) on the north. Approximately 4,000 people use the tunnel each day. It opened in 1902.

Design and construction

The tunnel was designed by civil engineer Sir Alexander Binnie for London County Council and constructed by contractor John Cochrane & Co. The project started in June 1899 and the tunnel opened on 4 August 1902. The tunnel replaced an expensive and sometimes unreliable ferry service allowing workers living south of the Thames to reach their workplaces in the London docks and shipyards in or near the Isle of Dogs. Its creation owed much to the efforts of working-class politician Will Crooks, who had worked in the docks and, after chairing the LCC's Bridges Committee responsible for the tunnel, later served as Labour MP for Woolwich.

The entrance shafts at both ends are beneath glazed domes. Lifts, installed in 1904, were upgraded in 1992 and again in 2012, and helical staircases allow pedestrians to access the tile-lined tunnel, which slopes gently from both sides down to a midway lowpoint beneath the river. The cast-iron rings are coated with concrete and surfaced with some 200,000 white glazed tiles. The northern end was damaged by bombs during the Second World War and repairs included a thick steel and concrete inner lining that substantially reduces the diameter for a short distance. The northern shaft staircase has 87 steps; the southern one has 100.

Upgrade works
Before renovations from 2010 onwards, the attendant-operated lift service was only open from 7 am to 7 pm on weekdays and Saturdays, and 10 am to 5.30 pm on Sundays, with no service on Christmas Day or Boxing Day. Staff shortages and other problems meant that even during these times the lifts were often unavailable. Since 1999, if the lift was not functioning, anyone unable to use the stairs could take the Docklands Light Railway between Island Gardens DLR station (close to the northern end of the tunnel) and Cutty Sark DLR station (close to the southern end). However, non-folding bicycles are not permitted on the Docklands Light Railway system at peak times.

Greenwich Council started work to upgrade the tunnel on 19 April 2010, intending to reduce leakage, improve drainage and install new lifts, CCTV, communication facilities and signage. Completion was planned for March 2011 but this slipped to September 2011. The tunnel was supposed to be accessible throughout most of the renovations, but it closed completely in February 2011. Stair use was soon regained but lifts remained out of service until early 2012, and remained subject to occasional brief closures during 2012. In October 2012 Greenwich Council acknowledged that the upgrade work had not been completed on time and had run over budget. The work was finally completed and included new customer-operated lifts with surface level availability signs, CCTV coverage, upgraded lighting and renewal or replacement of vital structural components.

The lifts were out of action for a long period in 2021-22 which Greenwich Council attributed to an international supply chain problem affecting the supply of spare parts.

Location

The tunnel links
 Greenwich town centre on the south bank of the Thames. Its entrance is close to the prow of the restored clipper Cutty Sark.
with
 parts of Docklands including Canary Wharf on the north bank. The tunnel's northern entrance is within Island Gardens, a park on the southern tip of the Isle of Dogs, with views across the river to the former Greenwich Hospital, the Queen's House and the Royal Greenwich Observatory.

Coordinates
 Greenwich entrance: 
 Tower Hamlets entrance:

Usage

A notice at the tunnel entrance states that the tunnel is private property (the Royal Borough of Greenwich manages the Greenwich and Woolwich foot tunnels on joint behalf of two other partners, the London Borough of Tower Hamlets and the London Borough of Newham) and not a public right of way. Ordnance Survey maps do not show a right of way on the route of the tunnel. The tunnel is also part of the UK's National Cycle Route 1 linking Inverness and Dover. A National Trail, the Thames Path, uses the tunnel to rejoin the southbound part of the path.

A 2016 survey showed that around 4,000 people use the tunnel each day.

The 'Friends of Greenwich and Woolwich foot tunnels' (FOGWOFT) was established in September 2013. Following encouragement from FOGWOFT and information from the Institution of Civil Engineers, on 5 July 2016 an interpretative plaque was unveiled near the tunnel's Greenwich entrance by the deputy leader of Greenwich council.

Cycling

Local bylaws require cyclists to dismount and push their bikes through the tunnel, although plans to remove this requirement have been considered. In 2016, an 'active mobility' system was installed in the tunnel to monitor and actively manage tunnel usage. The system used computer vision to count and measure the speed of bicycles and pedestrians, and displayed messages on electronic signs to encourage considerate behaviour. The system (also installed in the Woolwich foot tunnel) displayed two messages: "No cycling allowed" (in red text) during busy periods, and "Please consider pedestrians" (in green text) during quiet periods, aiming to make urban shared spaces safer and more pleasant to use for all. The shared spaces trial was supported by Greenwich council but Tower Hamlets refused permission to update the bylaws and the sign system was discontinued; while some cyclists do ride in the tunnel, cycling is still not permitted.

With a continuing impasse in updating the bylaws, FOGWOFT disbanded in March 2021.

In January 2023 Tower Hamlets Council considered a motion expressing continuing concern about cycling in the Tunnel.

See also

 Tunnels underneath the River Thames
 Crossings of the River Thames

Notes

External links
Greenwich Council foot tunnels page
 Sound files and video of the tunnel
 Greenwich Council official twitter feed with updates regarding lift failures.

Tunnels underneath the River Thames
Buildings and structures in the Royal Borough of Greenwich
Buildings and structures in the London Borough of Tower Hamlets
Transport in the Royal Borough of Greenwich
Transport in the London Borough of Tower Hamlets
Footpaths in London
Pedestrian tunnels in the United Kingdom
Tourist attractions in the London Borough of Tower Hamlets
Tourist attractions in the Royal Borough of Greenwich
Tunnels completed in 1902
Grade II listed buildings in the Royal Borough of Greenwich